"Shine in the Light" is a single by Swiss singer-songwriter Anna Rossinelli. The song was released as the lead single from her re-released second studio album Marylou called Marylou Two (2014). The song has peaked to number 4 on the Swiss Singles Chart. The song was written by Anna Rossinelli, Georg Schlunegger, Georg Dillier, Manuel Meisel. The Swiss television studio SRF used the single Shine in the Light as their official song for the broadcast of the 2014 Winter Olympics.

Music video
A music video to accompany the release of "Shine in the Light" was first released onto YouTube on February 7, 2014 at a total length of three minutes and twenty-one seconds.

Track listing

Charts

Release history

References

Anna Rossinelli songs
2014 singles
2013 songs
Universal Music Group singles